Japanese-style peanuts, also known as Japanese peanuts or cracker nuts, are a type of snack food made from peanuts that are coated in a wheat flour dough and then fried or deep-fried. They come in a variety of different flavours.

This type of snack is claimed to have originated in Mexico in the 1940s where a Japanese immigrant by the name of Yoshigei Nakatani invented “Japanese peanuts” (widely known in the Spanish-speaking world as cacahuates Japoneses or maní Japonés). The Mexican version’s recipe for the extra-crunchy shell has ingredients such as wheat flour, soy sauce, water, sugar, monosodium glutamate, and citric acid.

Similar foods 
Chinese Indonesian Frans Go established the Netherlands based company Go & Zoon (later Go-Tan) and began manufacturing borrelnootje, peanuts coated in a crisp starch-based shell, under the name Katjang Shanghai (Shanghai nuts) in the 1950s.

Thai snack food company Mae-Ruay started producing peanuts fried in a wheat flour-based batter flavoured with coconut cream under the brand name Koh-Kae in 1976.

Picard Peanuts is a Canadian company that produces Chip Nuts, a snack food brand consisting of peanuts that have a potato chip coating. Various flavors of potato chips are used in the product's production.

An identical product is sold in Lebanon under the name "krikri".

The term "cracker nuts" was first used by the Philippine brand Nagaraya in 1967.

See also 

 Nagaraya
 Koh-Kae
 Borrelnootje
 Beer Nuts
 Kaki no tane
 List of snack foods

References 

Snack foods
Peanuts
Mexican cuisine